The white gaze is the assumption that the default reader or observer is coming from a perspective of someone who identifies as white, or that people of color sometimes feel need to take into account the white reader or observer's reaction. Various authors of color describe it as a voice in their heads that reminds them that their writing, characters, and plot choices are going to be judged by white readers, and that the reader or viewer, by default, is white.

Description 
Toni Morrison wrote and spoke influentially about rejecting the white gaze. In an analysis of whiteness in American literature, Morrison said, "What happens to the writerly imagination of a black author who is at some level always conscious of representing one's race to, or in spite of, a race of readers that understands itself to be 'universal' or race-free?" In the documentary Toni Morrison: The Pieces I Am, she calls it “The little white man that sits on your shoulder and checks out everything you do or say. You sort of knock him off and you’re free." 

Writer L J Alonge described it in terms of writing "a scene about two kids trying to dine-and-dash, something I'd done, and stop to wonder if I was playing into narratives about 'black criminality.' I'd try to write a scene about a kid getting into a fight, something else I'd done, and feel like I was fueling ideas about 'black-on-black violence.'"

Representations 
The Pulitzer prize-winning play Fairview, by Jackie Sibblies Drury, focuses on the white gaze; the play's title is a play on the phrase. Hannah Miao, reviewing it, describes the White gaze as "being watched from a lens of otherness that is sometimes violently obvious, and sometimes so subtle that you find yourself wondering whether you made it up entirely. It is fetishization and repulsion, appropriation and persecution, misrepresentation and erasure, all at once."

A 2018 exhibit at California Institute of Integral Studies, White Gaze, investigated "the role of photography, and specifically the images of National Geographic, in reinforcing racist hierarchies in the cultural imaginary of the West".

In the US vs. in Africa 
Dana Williams, president of the Toni Morrison Society, noted that the concept was a Western construct, and that in the mid-20th century African writers wrote stories on their own terms. In the US at the same time, according to Williams, black writers writing about black subjects "were always thinking about it in the context of race and white people reading".

See also 

 Gaze
 Imperial gaze
 Male gaze

References

Further reading 

 Ilmi, Ahmed (2011). "The White Gaze vs. the Black Soul". Race, Gender & Class. 18 (3/4): 217–229. ISSN 1082-8354.

Sociological theories
Sociological terminology